Eduard Novák (November 27, 1946 – October 20, 2010) was a Czechoslovak ice hockey player, a bronze medalist from the 1972 Winter Olympics, and a silver medalist from the 1976 Winter Olympics. He was born in Buštěhrad, Czechoslovakia.

References

External links
 
 
 
 
 

1946 births
2010 deaths
Czech ice hockey right wingers
Czechoslovak ice hockey right wingers
Olympic ice hockey players of Czechoslovakia
Olympic silver medalists for Czechoslovakia
Olympic bronze medalists for Czechoslovakia
Olympic medalists in ice hockey
Ice hockey players at the 1972 Winter Olympics
Ice hockey players at the 1976 Winter Olympics
Medalists at the 1972 Winter Olympics
Medalists at the 1976 Winter Olympics
Rytíři Kladno players
EC KAC players
Füchse Duisburg players
People from Buštěhrad
Sportspeople from the Central Bohemian Region
Czech ice hockey coaches
Czechoslovak ice hockey coaches
Czechoslovak expatriate sportspeople in Japan
Czechoslovak expatriate sportspeople in West Germany
Czechoslovak expatriate sportspeople in Austria
Czechoslovak expatriate ice hockey people
Expatriate ice hockey players in Japan
Expatriate ice hockey players in Austria
Expatriate ice hockey players in West Germany